Athonite, "of/from/related to Athos", may refer to:

Athanasius the Athonite
Euthymius the Athonite
George the Athonite
John the Athonite
Silouan the Athonite
Simon the Athonite
Clive Strutt's Symphony No.7 in G minor Athonite